June (The Handmaid's Tale) may refer to:

 "June" (The Handmaid's Tale episode), an episode
 June Osborne (The Handmaid's Tale), a character